Open is a 2010 American drama film, written and directed by Jake Yuzna. The story centers around two intertwined love stories starring real queer, trans, pandrogynous individuals  as they explore new forms of love, sex, and gender emerging at the dawn of the new millennium.

Premiering in the Panorama section of the Berlin Film Festival in 2010, Open became the first American film to win the Teddy Jury Prize at the Teddy Award.  The film also won Best Narrative Film at the TLV Festival in Tel Aviv Israel, Best Performance at Newfest, as well as having the Jake Yuzna named a Four in Focus filmmaker at Outfest.  Much of the film was inspired by the artist and musician Genesis P-Orridge, who served as creative consultant on the film and is included in a post screening dialog with Jake Yuzna at New Museum  available as a DVD bonus feature on the North American release. The Detroit-based music duo Adult (band) created an original score for the film.

The film was produced by Narrative Films and released by Ariztical Entertainment in North America on September 27, 2011.

Plot
When the young hermaphrodite Cynthia (Gaea Gaddy) meets Gen (Tempest Crane) and Jay (Jendeen Forberg), a couple recovering from plastic surgery, she learns of Pandrogyny, in which two people merge their facial features in order to reflect their evolution from separate identities into one unified entity.

Inspired by this, Cynthia abandons her husband and suburban life to embark on a road trip with Gen through the remnants of 20th century America.

Simultaneously, a young trans man, Syd (Morty Diamond), meets a young punk man, Nick (Daniel Luedtke). After having sex with one another, and someone born of the opposite assigned sex for the first time, Syd and Nick find themselves falling into love, a love that forces them to confront how hormone treatments have forever changed sex and relationships.

Not science fiction, but American reality, OPEN brings together a cast of real hermaphroditic, pandrogynous, and transpeople to create a revealing look at the pioneers of the new human experience, and the emerging possibilities for humanity at the dawn of a new millennium.

Cast
 Gaea Gaddy as Cynthia, a young intersex person.
 Morty Diamond as Sid, a young trans man.
 Daniel Luedtke as Nick, a young queer man.
 Tempest Crane and Jendeen Forberg as Gen and Jaye, a pandrogynous person based on Genesis and Lady Jaye Breyer P Orridge.

Awards
 2010 Teddy Jury Prize at the Teddy Award
 Best Narrative Film at the TLV Festival in Tel Aviv Israel
 Best Performance (awarded to actor Morty Diamond) at Newfest
 Four in Focus filmmaker (awarded to director Jake Yuzna) at Outfest.

References

External links
 
 
 Distributor Website

2010 3D films
American drama films
2010s English-language films
American LGBT-related films
Films about trans men
2010 LGBT-related films
2010 films
LGBT-related drama films
Queer-related mass media
2010s American films